Ritter is the second lowest-ranking title of nobility in German-speaking areas, just above an Edler, considered roughly equal to the title Knight or Baronet. 

This list includes only those whose main Wikipedia article includes the titular 'Ritter' in the article name. There are many others whose name could include the title but whose main entry is at the non-titular version of the name.

People whose names include the title Ritter:

 Hans Ritter von Adam (1886–1917), German flying ace in World War I
 Rudolf Ritter von Alt (1812–1905), Austrian landscape and architectural painter
 Carl Ferdinand Ritter von Arlt (1812–1887), Austrian ophthalmologist
 Joseph Calasanza von Arneth (1791–1863), Austrian numismatist and archaeologist
 Alfred Ritter von Arneth (1819–1897), Austrian historian
 Ludwig August Ritter von Benedek (1804–1881), Austrian general, commander at the Battle of Königgrätz
 Jakob Ritter von Danner (1865–1942), Bavarian general, put down the Beer Hall Putsch
 Leopold Ritter von Dittel (1815–1898), Austrian urologist
 Franz Ritter von Epp (1868–1946), officer in the Imperial German Army, early member of the Nazi party
 Paul Johann Anselm Ritter von Feuerbach (1775–1833), German legal scholar
 Georg Ritter von Frauenfeld (1807–1873), Austrian naturalist
 Friedrich Ritter von Friedländer-Malheim (1825–1901), Bohemian-Austrian painter
 Carl Ritter von Ghega (1802–1860), Albania-Italian engineer
 Robert Ritter von Greim (1892–1945), German field marshal during World War II
 Wilhelm Karl Ritter von Haidinger (1795–1871), Austrian mineralogist, geologist, and physicist
 Franz Ritter von Hauer (1822–1899), Austrian geologist
 Ferdinand Ritter von Hebra (1816–1880), Austrian physician and dermatologist
 Gustav Ritter von Kahr (1862–1934), German conservative politician in Bavaria
 Ludwig Ritter von Köchel (1800–1877), Austrian musicologist, catalogued the works of Mozart (K numbers)
 Karl Heinrich Lang, Ritter von Lang (1764–1835), German historian and statesman
 Wilhelm Ritter von Leeb (1876–1956), German field marshal during World War II
 Karl Gottfried Ritter von Leitner (1800–1890), German author, editor, and publicist
 Johann Ritter von Oppolzer (1808–1871), Austrian physician
 Georg Ritter von Schönerer (1842–1921), Austrian politician
 Carl Franz Anton Ritter von Schreibers (1775–1852), Austrian naturalist
 Lorenz Ritter von Stransky (1889–1923), German engineer and early member of the Nazi Party
 Wilhelm Ritter von Thoma (1891–1948), German officer who served in World War I, the Spanish Civil War, and World War II
 Georg Ludwig von Trapp (1880–1947), Austrian naval officer, headed the singing family immortalized in The Sound of Music
 Heinrich Ritter von Zeissberg (1839–1899), Austrian historian
 Johann Georg Ritter von Zimmermann (1728–1795), Swiss philosophical writer and physician
 Anselm Franz von Ritter zu Groenesteyn (1692–1765), Dutch-German government official and architect
 Eduard Ritter von Weber, the German mathematician

See also
Ritter (surname)

Noble titles
Men's social titles